Fred, Frihet & Alt Gratis (peace, freedom & everything free) is an album released by the Norwegian hip hop group Gatas Parlament.

Track listing 

2004 albums
Gatas Parlament albums